The United States competed at the 1950 World Archery Championships in Copenhagen, Denmark in from 26 to 30 July 1950   The United States entered a squad of 5 archers and competed in 3 events, the men's and women's individual events, and men's team events. The team one gold with Jean Lee in the women's individual.
Russ Reynolds, who was suffering from leukemia won bronze in the men's individual was presented with the gold medal from the winner Hans Deutgen.

Individual

Men

Women

Individual

Men

References

World Archery Championships
1950 in American sports
1950 in archery
Archery in the United States